Tamla Kari Cummins (born 27 July 1988), known as Tamla Kari, is an English actress. She is best known for her role as Constance Bonacieux in the BBC television series The Musketeers, and Lucy in The Inbetweeners Movie and The Inbetweeners 2.

Early life
Kari was born and brought up in Coventry, West Midlands.

Career
During the second term of her final year at Drama Centre London, Kari won the role of Lucy in The Inbetweeners Movie. She has since had various roles in a number of plays. She also appeared in the fourth series of the BBC Three supernatural drama series Being Human and the second series of Silk. She formerly appeared in the BBC Three sitcom Cuckoo, which premiered on 25 September 2012, as well as in The Musketeers, in which she portrayed Constance Bonacieux. In 2013, she played Danielle in the ITV comedy The Job Lot. In 2014, she reprised the role of Lucy in The Inbetweeners 2. In 2020, Kari began appearing in The First Team as Olivia, a comedy series created by the same team as The Inbetweeners. In 2021, Kari narrated for the 7th series of 999: On the frontline.

Filmography

Film

Television

Stage

 Saturday Night and Sunday Morning
 Solo Showing
 An Experiment with an Air Pump
 Tartuffe
 Twelfth Night
 Don Carlos
 The Kitchen
 Our Town
 Philistines
 Versailles
 This is Living
 While the Sun Shines

References

External links 

1988 births
English television actresses
Living people
Actresses from Coventry
Alumni of the Drama Centre London
English stage actresses
21st-century English actresses
English film actresses